The National Glass Bottle Makers' Society was a trade union representing workers involved in the manufacture of glass bottles in the United Kingdom.

The union was founded in Leeds in 1903 as a split from the National Flint Glass Makers' Society of Great Britain and Ireland.  It affiliated to the Trades Union Congress (TUC), at which time it was led by F. Swann and had 987 members.  It soon left the TUC but remained active until it merged into the Transport and General Workers' Union in 1940.

See also
 List of trade unions
 Transport and General Workers' Union
 TGWU amalgamations

References
Arthur Ivor Marsh, Victoria Ryan. Historical Directory of Trade Unions, Volume 5 Ashgate Publishing, Ltd., Jan 1, 2006 pg. 435

Specific

Defunct trade unions of the United Kingdom
Glass trade unions
Trade unions disestablished in 1940
Transport and General Workers' Union amalgamations
Trade unions based in West Yorkshire